Domenico Cunego (1724/25 – 8 January 1803) was an Italian printmaker. 

Cunego was born at Verona.  Having studied under the otherwise-unknown painter Francesco Ferrari, he began his artistic career as a painter, producing several works, all of which are now lost or untraceable. At age 18, however, he switched to engraving (a field in which he was possibly self-taught).  He died in Rome.

The engravings he made depicting Michelangelo's Sistine Chapel ceiling, published in Gavin Hamilton's Schola Italica Picturae (1773), were an important source for the artists of his time.
He is notable not only for reproducing paintings by his famous fellow-countrymen like Guido Reni and Italian contemporaries such as Antonio Balestra, Francesco Solimena, and Felice Boscaratti, but also works by British artists in Italy catering to Grand Tourists. The latter included Gavin Hamilton's cycle of 6 works on the Iliad   and David Allan's Origin of Portraiture. 

His sons Luigi (b. 1750) and Giuseppe (b. 1760) were also engravers.

Works

Illustrations for the 3-volume catalogue of Giacomo Muselli's coin collection, in collaboration with Dionigi Valesi (1752, 1756, 1760). Internet Archive 
Views of Verona after drawings by T. Majeroni (1750s)
St Thomas of Villanova (1757), after a painting by Antonio Balestra (a frequent source for Cunego)
Some of the engravings for Ruins of the palace of the Emperor Diocletian at Spalato in Dalmatia. by Robert Adam, 1764

Notes

Sources
Art Encyclopedia. The Concise Grove Dictionary of Art.
Bryan, Michael (1903). Bryan's dictionary of painters and engravers, Volume 1. G. Bell and sons

1724 births
1803 deaths
Italian printmakers
Artists from Verona
18th-century Italian artists